Andrew Jordan or Andy Jordan may refer to:

 Andrew Jordan (American football) (born 1972), former NFL tight end
 Andrew Jordan (racing driver) (born 1989), English motor racing driver
 Andy Jordan (footballer) (born 1979), Scottish footballer
 Andy Jordan (TV personality) (born 1990), musician and cast member of Made in Chelsea